Wataru Tanigawa is a Japanese artistic gymnast. He is a two-time bronze medalist at the World Artistic Gymnastics Championships and a two-time gold medalist at the Summer Universiade.

At the 2017 Summer Universiade in Taipei, Taiwan, he won the gold medal in the men's team all-around event. He also won the bronze medal in four individual events: individual all-around, floor, parallel bars and horizontal bar. In the same year, he also competed at the 2017 World Artistic Gymnastics Championships without winning a medal.

In 2019, he won the gold medal in the men's team event at the 2019 Summer Universiade in Naples, Italy.

Personal life 
Tanigawa started gymnastics at age six at Kenshin Sports Club in Funabashi, Japan.

Tanigawa's younger brother,  Kakeru, also represented Japan in artistic gymnastics at the 2019 World Championships in Stuttgart, Germany and the 2018 Asian Games in Indonesia.

Tanigawa studied sports science at Juntendo University in Tokyo.

Career 
2017
Tanigawa competed at the 2017 World Championships in Montreal, Canada.

2018
Tanigawa competed at the 2018 World Championships in Doha, Qatar, where his team placed third.

2019
Tanigawa competed at the 2019 World Championships in Stuttgart, Germany, where his team placed third.

2021
At the 2020 Summer Olympics in Tokyo, Japan, Tanigawa competed for Japan, on a team including Kaya Kazuma, Kitazono Takeru and Hashimoto Daiki. The team won Olympic silver with a combined score of 262.397, 0.103 points beneath the winning team.

References

External links 
 

Living people
1996 births
Place of birth missing (living people)
Japanese male artistic gymnasts
Universiade medalists in gymnastics
Universiade gold medalists for Japan
Universiade bronze medalists for Japan
Medalists at the 2017 Summer Universiade
Medalists at the 2019 Summer Universiade
Gymnasts at the 2020 Summer Olympics
Olympic gymnasts of Japan
Olympic silver medalists for Japan
Medalists at the 2020 Summer Olympics
Olympic medalists in gymnastics
Sportspeople from Chiba Prefecture
21st-century Japanese people